Maalik Reynolds (born April 27, 1992) is an American high jumper.

Reynolds attended high school at The Westminster Schools in Atlanta, Georgia and graduated from the Wharton School of Business at the University of Pennsylvania in May 2014. He received a Bachelor of Science in Economics with a concentration in Management.

He jumps off his left foot. His personal best (outdoors) is 2.28 meters (7 ft-5.75in), achieved on May 7, 2011 at the Ivy League Outdoor Track and Field Championships, hosted by Yale University. His personal best (indoors) is 2.24 (7 ft-4.25in), achieved on February 7, 2014 at the Sykes & Sabock Challenge Cup at Penn State University. He was eighth at the NCAA Men's Indoor Track and Field Championship in 2012, having finished seventh in the previous year

International competitions

References

External links

 TFRRS Bio
 Penn Athletics Bio
DyeStat profile for Maalik Reynolds

1992 births
Living people
Track and field athletes from Atlanta
American male high jumpers
African-American male track and field athletes
Penn Quakers men's track and field athletes
21st-century African-American sportspeople